Mary James (born March 22, 1980), known by the stage name Mean Mary,  is an American singer-songwriter, multi-instrumentalist, novelist, producer and YouTube personality. She has been described as having “the unique ability to mix together a variety of musical styles, which can appeal to a wide audience” and her childhood has been described as “a nomadic life that could have been plucked from an adventure novel.”

Biography 
Mean Mary was born on March 22, 1980 in Geneva, Alabama, though her family lived near Bonifay, Florida, about two miles from Alabama. She was the youngest of six children. She could read music before she could read words and wrote original songs at age five. After recording her first original tune (and theme song), "Mean Mary from Alabam'", at age six, the song went public and it was then she was given the name Mean Mary by the press.

From 1986 – 1989 she was a regular on the Country Boy Eddie Show on WBRC-TV in Birmingham, Alabama.

On February 14, 2003, she was the passenger in a car accident. Her head broke the windshield and her neck cracked the dashboard leaving her right vocal cord paralyzed with little hope of recovery. She performed as just an instrumentalist for the next year until in 2004 she was informed by a specialist that there was slight movement in the vocal cord with a possibility of full recovery.

Career 
Mean Mary tours extensively in the US and has performed in Canada, UK, Ireland, and Europe. Venues and events have included The NAMM Show Alberta Rose Theatre The Triple Door The Trumbull County Antique Tractor Show The Atkinson and Folk Alliance International. In 2018, Mean Mary appeared on The Red Jacket Jamboree, an old-time radio variety show recorded at the historic Calumet Theatre and distributed by PRX.

She has guested on many BBC radio shows including The John Toal Show BBC Radio Ulster where she performed live her original song "Born to Be That Woman." The show was later replayed as highlight of the year.

She was the on the May 2016 cover of Banjo Newsletter.

Discography
Mean Mary has published four solo studio albums with genres including Country, folk and Americana. Additionally she cooperated with other artists like her brother Frank on another two albums.

Solo albums
Walk a Little Ways With Me (2010, CD Baby, WoodRock)
Year of the Sparrow (2013, CD Baby)
Sweet (2016, self-released)
Blazing (2018, self-released/Woodrock Records); soundtrack to the 2018 novel Hell Is Naked
Cold (2019, self-released/Woodrock Records)
Alone (2020, self-released/Woodrock Records)

Studio albums with other artists
Thank You Very Much (2006, CD Baby, WoodRock): Mean Mary and Jamestown
Down Home (2017, Woodrock), Mean Mary and Frank James

Singles
"Ding Dong Day" (2008, WoodRock)

Bibliography
As a writer, Mary James has published a number of mystery novels together with her mother Jean, as well as a devotional and a music book for banjo and guitar.

Fiction

Others
 Tablature book and DVD.
 Christian devotional literature.

Awards 
Will Mclean Best New Florida Song Contest 2017 - 1st place winner: "Choctawhatchee Waltz" by Mean Mary (Mary James). 2nd Place: "We Never Hear the Song" by Mean Mary (Mary James) & Jean James.
15th Annual Independent Music Award song nominations: "Brand New Day" (Love Song category), "Trumbull County Antique Tractor Show (Bluegrass category), "Born to Be That Woman" (Americana category).
13th Annual Independent Music Awards Vox Populi winner (Americana Song): "Iron Horse"
2013 Readers Favorite International Book Awards - Gold Medal Winner Mystery Novel: "Wherefore Art Thou, Jane?" by Mary James (Mean Mary) and Jean James.

References

External links 

American women singer-songwriters
1980 births
Living people
American banjoists
American fiction writers
21st-century American singers
21st-century American women singers
People from Bonifay, Florida
American singer-songwriters